J. D. Jones (born November 21, 1936) is an American firearms and cartridge designer, firearms writer and president of SSK Industries. Jones began hunting at an early age, and became interested in bullet casting and handloading firearms cartridges. In the 1960s, Jones collaborated with Lee Jurras to create the Super Vel line of high-performance handgun ammunition.

In 1977, Jones founded SSK Industries, a company focused on cartridges and barrels (such as for the Thompson Center Arms Contender rifle-calibre pistol) for high-power handgun hunting and target shooting.

Also in the late 1970s, Jones founded Handgun Hunters International, an association of like-minded hunters who used handguns for their sport, and HHI's attendant newsletter, The Sixgunner.

Jones is primarily known for two lines of firearms cartridges. The first are the JDJ cartridges, primarily intended for the T/C Contender, ranging from .224 to .577 calibre. The second is the "Whisper" cartridge family, intended to cause maximum damage at subsonic speeds, making them nearly silent when used with a firearm suppressor.

Jones is a member of the National Rifle Association and Safari Club International and has authored two columns for American Handgunner magazine.

See also
 14.5mm JDJ
 .30-06 JDJ
 .950 JDJ

References

External links
 SSK Industries official site
 JDJ Cartridges at Ammo-One.com
 Firing the 950 JDJ - Video

Ammunition designers
Living people
1936 births
American gun rights activists
Gun writers